Mojave Ranch Estates is an unincorporated community and census-designated place (CDP) in Mohave County, Arizona, United States. The population was 53 as of the 2020 census.

Geography
Mojave Ranch Estates is in western Mohave County at  (34.949652, -114.593489). It is bordered to the south by the CDP of Mohave Valley. Arizona State Route 95 forms the western edge of the CDP; it leads north  to Bullhead City and south  to Needles, California, across the Colorado River.

Demographics

As of the census of 2000, there were 28 people, 6 households, and 6 families living in the CDP. There were 6 housing units at an average density of 8.1/sq mi (3.1/km2). The racial makeup of the CDP was 46% White, 25% Native American, 15% from other races, and 14% from two or more races. 79% of the population were Hispanic or Latino of any race.

There were 6 households, out of which 100% had children under the age of 18 living with them, 83% were married couples living together, and 17% had a female householder with no husband present. No households were made up of individuals, and none had someone living alone who was 65 years of age or older. The average household size was 4.7 and the average family size was 4.7.

In the CDP, the population was spread out, with 43% under the age of 18, 11% from 18 to 24, 25% from 25 to 44, and 21% from 45 to 64. The median age was 22 years. For every 100 females, there were 64.7 males. For every 100 females age 18 and over, there were 100.0 males.

The median income for a household in the CDP was $42,917, and the median income for a family was $42,917. Males had a median income of $11,786 versus $17,188 for females. The per capita income for the CDP was $8,359. None of the population and none of the families were below the poverty line.

References

Arizona placenames of Native American origin
Census-designated places in Mohave County, Arizona